Giuseppe Provenzano may refer to:
Giuseppe Provenzano (Italian politician, born 1946)
Giuseppe Provenzano (Italian politician born, 1982)